Montuenga de Soria is a village under the local government of the municipality of Arcos de Jalón, Soria, Spain, 105 kilometers from Madrid. The village had a population of 141 inhabitants in 2001.

The village is overlooked by the remains of Montuenga Castle.

References

Populated places in the Province of Soria